Distorsio parvimpedita is a species of medium-sized sea snail, a marine gastropod mollusk in the family Personidae, the Distortio snails.

Description

Distribution

References

Personidae
Gastropods described in 1998